The mixed team event of badminton at the 2010 Commonwealth Games was held from 4 to 8 October 2010 in Siri Fort Sports Complex, New Delhi, India where 20 teams competed in the competition.

Defending champions, Malaysia, won the gold medal for the second time in a row. They repeated this victory four years later at the 2014 Commonwealth Games in Glasgow. India took their first silver in the mixed team event and England settled for bronze.

Seeds
Five pots arranged during the draw, with pot 1 is strongest, while pot 5 was the weakest team in the event.

Results

Groups

Group A

Group B

Group C

Group D

Round of 16

Bronze Play Off

Final

References

Badminton at the 2010 Commonwealth Games
Commonwealth